Breynia elegans is a species of sea urchins of the Family Loveniidae. Their armour is covered with spines. Breynia elegans was first scientifically described in 1948 by Ole Theodor Jensen Mortensen.

See also 

 Breynia australasiae
 Breynia desorii
 Breynia neanika

References

Animals described in 1948
Spatangoida
Taxa named by Ole Theodor Jensen Mortensen